Lee Ji-young (Hangul: 이지영, Hanja: 李知栄) (born February 27, 1986 in Incheon) is a South Korean catcher for the Kiwoom Heroes of the KBO League. He bats and throws right-handed.

Amateur career 
After graduating from Jemulpo High School in Incheon, Lee entered Kyungsung University in Busan. In August 2005, Lee was first called up to the South Korea national baseball team as an amateur player and participated in the Baseball World Cup held in the Netherlands where Team Korea eventually won the silver medal. At the World Cup, he appeared as a starting catcher in the preliminary game against Sweden.

Notable international careers

Professional career 

After graduation from college, Lee went undrafted in the  KBO Entry Draft and signed as an original free agent with the Samsung Lions. He played no games his first year but made a positive impact next season, playing in 23 games as a backup catcher and driving in 4 runs out of 6 hits.

Lee joined the two-year military service after the  season and was discharged in September . In October 2011, Lee was selected for the South Korean national baseball team for the 2011 Baseball World Cup. In the tourney, he batted .289 with 13 hits including a solo home run off of Eliecer Navarro of Panama appearing in all 12 games as a fixture at first base for Team Korea.

On December 7, 2018, he moved through a triangular trade between Kim Dong-yup, who was a member of the SK Wyverns, and Ko Jong-wook, who was a member of the Nexen Heroes.

Notable international careers

Filmography

Television show

References

External links 

1986 births
KBO League catchers
Kyungsung University alumni
Living people
Samsung Lions players
South Korean baseball players
Sportspeople from Incheon
2023 World Baseball Classic players